Považany is a village and municipality in Nové Mesto nad Váhom District in the Trenčín Region of western Slovakia.

History
In historical records the village was first mentioned in 1263.

Geography
The municipality lies at an altitude of 177 metres and covers an area of 4.045 km². It has a population of about 561 people.

References

External links

  Official page
http://www.statistics.sk/mosmis/eng/run.html

Villages and municipalities in Nové Mesto nad Váhom District